This is a list of submarines that have served the Italian Navy.

Glauco class
 
 
 
 
 

Medusa class
 
 
 
 
 
 
 
 

Nautilus class
 
 
Pullino class
 
 
Alfa class - midget submarines
 
 
  - ordered as Svyatoy Georgi for the Imperial Russian Navy
 - ordered as SM U-42 for the Imperial German Navy
 Former British S class
 - former 
 - former 
 - former 
A class - midget submarines
  
  
  
  
  
  
 Former British W class
 - former 
 - former 
 - former 
 - former 
X1 - former German SM UC-12
B class - midget submarines
 
 
 
Pacinotti class
  
  
F class
 
 
 
 
 
 
 
 
 
 
 
 
 
 
 
 
 
 
 
 
 
N class
 
 
 
 
 
 
H class
 
 
 
 
 
 
 
 
X2 class
 
 
Micca class
 
 
 
 
 
 
Barbarigo class
 
 
 
 
Mameli class
 
 
  - former Masaniello
 
Balilla class

Pisani class

Bandiera class

Bragadin class

Squalo class

Settembrini class

Argonauta class

 - former Nautilus
Sirena class

Archimede class

Glauco class

Calvi class

Argo class

Perla class

Adua class

Foca class

CA class - midget submarines
Type 1:

Type 2:

Marcello class

 

Brin class

Liuzzi class

Marconi class

Cagni class

Acciaio class
Acciaio
Alabastro
Argento
Asteria
Avorio
Bronzo
Cobalto
Giada
Granito
Nichelio
Platino
Porfido
Volframio
CM class - midget submarines

Flutto class or Tritone class
Type 1:

Type 2:

R class or Romolo class

R 3 - R 12 - scuttled incomplete and scrapped after the war
CB class - midget submarines

 Former US Gato class
 - former USS Dace (SS-247)
 - former USS Barb (SS-220)
 Former US Balao class
 - former USS Capitaine (SS-336)
 - former USS Lizardfish (SS-373)
 - former USS Besugo (SS-321)
 Former US Tench class
 - former USS Pickerel (SS-524)
 - former USS Volador (SS-490)
 Former US Tang class
 - former USS Trigger (SS-564)
 - former USS Harder (SS-568)
Toti class

Sauro class
 Nazario Sauro type 
 
 
 
 
Salvatore Pelosi type
 
 
 Primo Longobardo type
 
 
Todaro  class or Type 212

See also
 List of submarines of the Second World War
 Italian submarines of World War II

External links
 List of Italian Submarines (and their activity) during WWII

Italy
Italy